Hieracium megacephalum, the coastal plain hawkweed, is a North American plant species in the tribe Cichorieae within the family Asteraceae. It grows only in the southeastern United States, in Georgia, Florida, and the Carolinas.

One stalk can produce as many as 50 flower heads in a flat-topped array. Each head has 20–50 yellow ray flowers but no disc flowers.

References

megacephalum
Flora of the Southeastern United States
Plants described in 1895
Flora without expected TNC conservation status